Bryobium irukandjianum, commonly known as the small urchin orchid, is an epiphytic or lithophytic clump-forming orchid that has small, fleshy green pseudobulbs, each with two or three leaves and between seven and twelve small, short-lived, whitish to dull pink flowers.  This orchid only occurs in tropical North Queensland.

Description
Flowering occurs from October to December.

Taxonomy and naming
The small urchin orchid was first formally described in 1955 by Stanley F. Goessling-St Cloud who gave it the name Eria irukandjiana and published the description in The North Queensland Naturalist. In 2002 Mark Clements and David Jones changed the name to Bryobium irukandjianum. The specific epithet (irukandjianum) refers to the Irukandji people who lived in the area where this orchid grows. The ending -anum is a Latin suffix meaning "pertaining to" or "belonging to".

Distribution and habitat
Bryobium irukandjianum mostly grows on the upper branches of trees in humid situations. It is found in Queensland between the McIlwraith Range and the Atherton Tableland.

References

irukandjianum
Orchids of Queensland
Plants described in 1955